The following is a list of episodes from the second series of Green Wing. Green Wing is a surreal sitcom set in the fictional East Hampton Hospital, starring Tamsin Greig, Stephen Mangan and Julian Rhind-Tutt. Each episode was written by a team of eight writers, namely Victoria Pile (also the producer), Robert Harley, Gary Howe, Stuart Kenworthy, Oriane Messina, Richard Preddy, Fay Rusling and James Henry. Tristram Shapeero and Dominic Brigstocke directed all the episodes together. The second series consists of eight episodes broadcast between 31 March and 19 May 2006 on Channel 4. A DVD of the series was released on 2 October 2006.

The second series continues the plot from the first, which ended with Dr. Caroline Todd (Greig) and Dr. "Mac" Macartney (Rhind-Tutt) falling in love, and he, Dr. Guy Secretan (Mangan) and Dr. Martin Dear (Karl Theobald) teetering over the edge of a cliff in a stolen ambulance after Guy has a nervous breakdown. The second series starts with Mac in a coma and Guy having to perform community service as punishment for stealing the ambulance. When Mac awakes from his coma, it is discovered that he has amnesia, meaning that he has no memory of his relationship with Caroline. As Caroline tries to make him remember, Mac's former girlfriend Holly Hawkes (Sally Phillips) returns to the hospital, claiming that he is the father of her son. Elsewhere in the hospital, Dr. Alan Statham (Mark Heap) and Joanna Clore (Pippa Haywood) become paranoid after they accidentally murder Joanna's dwarf cousin.

Cast
Most of the regular cast appear in all episodes. The only exception is the character of Dr. Angela Hunter (played by Sarah Alexander), who appears in the first three episodes and then leaves the hospital. Among the recurring guest characters are Dr. Holly Hawkes, Lyndon Jones (played by Paterson Joseph), Oliver (Ken Charles), The Neurosurgeon (Pip Torrens), Jake Leaf (Darren Boyd) and Charles Robertson (Harley). However, the character of Charles is credited as "CEO" in the episodes in which he appears. Guest actors who appear in this series include Nick Frost, Peter McDonald, Big Mick and Rosie Cavaliero. Apart from Harley, other Green Wing writers make cameo performances in the show, including Fay Rusling and Oriane Messina.

Reception
Critics considered the second series worse than series one. In particular, the first episode of the series was seen as poor. Cathy Pryor in The Independent on Sunday wrote of the episode:

"Sadly, though, since I'm something of a fan, I have to report that the first episode of the second series is, disappointingly, rather flat. To be fair, there were a couple of laugh-out-loud moments—Dr Statham banging his head and falling down being one of them—but the whole didn't quite gel. Or should that be coagulate? I'll stop making bad jokes now since I'm still not as funny as anyone in the show. But I sincerely hope that the opener is a one-off and not a sign that Green Wing is going down the pan."

A. A. Gill was also highly critical of the episode in The Sunday Times:

"Within two minutes, Green Wing had destroyed itself, lost its assured grip on the cliff of comedy and tumbled into the abyss of embarrassing overacting, formless gurning and pointless repetition. What had once looked Dada-ishly brilliant now looked like stoned improv from a show-off's drama school. The lack of plot and coherent narrative that previously had been a blessed freedom was revealed to be a formless free-for-all, brilliant performances as silly mannerisms. Nothing I've seen this year has disappointed me as sharply as the second series of Green Wing."

Chris Riley for the Daily Telegraph gave a more mixed review of the series, writing that it was "so far proving oddly impenetrable—particularly given how, first time around, it consistently demonstrated what a firm grasp it had on when to cut loose, and when to deliver more conventional laughs. But there's still enough delirious madness going on to ensure that diehard fans won't be giving up hope just yet."

The Observer was more positive, saying that Green Wing was one of the top ten television programmes of 2006. Broadcast magazine voted Green Wing the joint-second best comedy series in 2006, alongside the sketch show That Mitchell and Webb Look, which also stars some Green Wing actors such as Olivia Colman (Harriet Schulenburg) and Paterson Joseph. They described the series as "fresh, subversive, and surreal."

Although the second series was heavily advertised, the first episode of the series was watched by 1.8 million people (8% of the audience). The first episode of the first series, "Caroline's First Day", attracted 2.2 million (11%) in comparison. The second episode attracted the same ratings as the previous episode, while the last episode was watched by 2 million viewers (11% of the audience). The second series was also nominated for two Royal Television Society awards; for "Best Production Design—Entertainment & Non Drama Productions" and "Best Tape & Film Editing—Entertainment & Situation Comedy", but failed to win.

Episodes

References

Green Wing